Borabanda railway station is a railway station in Hyderabad, Telangana, India. Localities like Mothi Nagar, Rajeev Nagar and Erragadda are accessible from this station.

Lines
Hyderabad Multi-Modal Transport System
Secunderabad–Falaknuma route (SF Line)

External links
MMTS Timings as per South Central Railway

MMTS stations in Hyderabad